Paul Mauch (8 May 1897 – 15 July 1924) was a German international footballer.

References

1897 births
1924 deaths
Association football goalkeepers
German footballers
Germany international footballers
VfB Stuttgart players